is a Japanese animated television series . Its episodes are directed by Itsuro Kawasaki and produced by the Japanese animation studio ZEXCS and Victor Entertainment. ZEXCS produced the animation and Victor Entertainment was responsible for developing the music. They are based on the light novel series Rental Magica by Makoto Sando and illustrated by pako, and adapt the source material over twenty-four episodes. The plot of the episodes follows Itsuki Iba, the newly appointed president of Astral, a company that dispatches magicians to perform jobs involving supernatural phenomena, and his interactions with his employees and Astral's competitors.

The episodes aired from October 7, 2007 to March 23, 2008 on Chiba TV and TV Saitama, with the episodes later broadcast on KBS Kyoto, Sun TV, Tokyo MX TV, TV Aichi, TV Hokkaido, TV Kanagawa, and TVQ Kyushu Broadcasting Co. The order that the episodes air in is nonlinear; for instance, the first episode broadcast is the sixth episode chronologically. The exceptions are episodes four, eight, and episodes sixteen through twenty, which are in the same broadcast and chronological order.

Four pieces of theme music are used for the episodes; two opening themes and two ending themes. The ending themes are Jungo Yoshida's  and an a cappella version of "Aruite Ikō", sung by the Astral members' voice actors, used in episodes twelve and twenty-one. A single containing both opening themes was released on November 21, 2007, and a single for the closing themes was released on the same date.

Several DVD compilations have been released by Kadokawa. The compilations contain two episodes of the series, with the first four released on December 21, 2007, January 25, 2008, February 22, 2008, and March 21, 2008 respectively. The fifth compilation is set for release on April 25, 2008.

Episode list
''Note: B = episode number by broadcast order (nonlinear), C = episode number chronologically.

See also

List of The Melancholy of Haruhi Suzumiya episodes — another anime series with a nonlinear episode order
List of Hidamari Sketch episodes — a third anime series with a nonlinear episode order

References
General

Specific

External links
Official website 

Rental Magica